The Ministry of Defense of the Republic of Kazakhstan (Qazaqstan Respublikasynyñ Qorğanys ministrlıgı) is a government agency of Kazakhstan which is the main executive body in implementing military policy. The Defense Minister of the Republic of Kazakhstan is the head of the Ministry of Defense, whose duties are to exercise the administrative leadership of the Armed Forces of the Republic of Kazakhstan. The ministry was established in May 1992. The first Minister of Defense was Army General Sagadat Nurmagambetov who served from May 1992 to October 16, 1995.

Functions 
The Ministry of Defense conducts the following tasks:

 Implements the state defense policy, military-political and military-economic management of the Armed Forces of the Republic of Kazakhstan
 To act as the headquarters of the armed forces
 To carry out its activities in accordance with the Constitution of the Republic of Kazakhstan
 To serve as a legal entity in the organizational and legal form of a state institution
 Makes decisions drawn up by orders and directives of the Minister of Defense and Kazakh Government

General Staff 

The General Staff of the Armed Forces of the Republic of Kazakhstan is the main body for the management of the armed forces of the state in peacetime and wartime, coordinates the development of plans for the construction and development of the Armed Forces, other troops and military formations, their operational, combat and mobilization training, organizes and carries out strategic planning application and interaction of the Armed Forces, other troops and military formations, and also develops a plan for the operational equipment of the country's territory in defense.

Organizational structure 
Organizational structure as of 2020:

 General Directorate of Physical Training
 General Directorate of Informatization and Telecommunications
 General Directorate of Public Procurement 
 Central Archive of the Ministry of Defense 
 Office of the Commander-in-Chief of the Ground Forces
 Management of the commanders of troops and combat arms
 Central Command Post
 Arms Reduction Control Center
 Center for Metrological Support
 Pension Center
 Central Army Sports Club
 Center for Military Space Programs
 Center for Military Representatives
 Administrative Department
 Department of International Cooperation
 Department of Combat Training
 Department of Economics and Finance
 Department of Personnel and Military Education
 Department of Organizational and Mobilization work
 Department of Information and Communication
 Department of Planning and cooperation
 Department of Educational and Ideological Work
 Legal Department
 Department of Military-Technical Policy
 Department of Military Science and Innovation
 Main Financial Inspectorate
 Main Inspectorate 
 General Directorate of Safety Oversight
 General Directorate of the Cantonment of Troops
 General Directorate of Communications
 General Directorate of Special Forces
 General Directorate of Territorial Defense
 Main Directorate of the Military Police
 General Directorate for the Protection of State Secrets and Information Security
Main Military Medical Directorate 
 Military Police 
 Office of the Commander-in-Chief of the Air Defense Forces 
 Office of the Chief of Logistics and Arms
 Office for work with sergeants
 Office of the Commander-in-Chief of the Navy
 Aviation Training Center
 Kazakhstan GIS Center
 Kazspetsexport
 Honor Guard Company of the Ministry of Defense of Kazakhstan
 Central Military Band of the Ministry of Defense of Kazakhstan
 Cadet Corps

Directorates 
during the formation of the structure of the Ministry of Defense of the Republic of Kazakhstan in November 1992, along with other departments, departments and services,

Directorate of Engineering Troops 
Colonel Marat Gareev, the former head of the engineering in the former Soviet 40th Army was appointed to be the first commander of military engineers in Kazakhstan, officers of which were staffed by those who had previously served in the Directorate of Engineering Troops of the Central Asian Military District. In 1993, there were 12 Soviet engineering units in Kazakhstan, and it became necessary to reorganize these units. In 1995, in Kapshagay, due to the reduction of 3 engineering units, an engineer regiment was formed and for its performance in 2003, it was the first in the history of the Armed Forces to be awarded the pennant of the Minister of Defense "For courage and military prowess". Similar regiments were formed in the Southern and Eastern Regional Commands. Due to the outflow of cadres from the country, the faculty of engineering troops was formed at the Almaty Higher Combined Arms Command School and since 1997, all military engineers have graduated from here.

Units

Military Police 

The Military Police of the Armed Forces of Kazakhstan is the military police branch of the Defence Ministry. It consists of special military units that are organizationally part of the armed forces as well as other security agencies to ensure the enforcement of law and order.

Honour guard and band 

The honour guard company and band are the main military units subordinate to the ministry and one of the senior ceremonial units in the country. The company is officially part of the 36th Air Assault Brigade of the Kazakh Airmobile Forces and is composed of personnel from the Ground Forces, Navy, and Air Force. Colonel Alexander Belyakov (Russian: Александр Викторович Беляков) was the original director of the band in November 1995 after he was commissioned to lead the massed bands by General Nurmagambetov in the Victory Day Parade on Almaty's Republic Square that May. In 2012, the band was relocated from Almaty to the capital of Astana.

Cadet Corps
The Cadet Corps of the Ministry of Defense of Kazakhstan named after Shoqan Walikhanov (Russian: Кадетский корпус Министерства обороны Республики Казахстан имени Чокана Валиханова) or the Shchuchinskiy Cadet Corps is an institution of the ministry that was formed on 1 July 1996 as a secondary school that prepared Kazakh youth for service in the military and for leadership as junior army, navy, and air force commanders. A similar task is done today by the Astana Zhas Ulan Republican School. A month after its formation, the corps had 96 enlisted cadets, most of whom came from the Alma-Ata Higher All-Arms Command School (now the Military Institute of the Kazakh Ground Forces). On its first graduation day on July 29, 1999, where 11 cadets graduated from the corps and enrolled in higher educational institutions, the corps received its own battle flag by the then head of the corps, Colonel Kuangaliev and defense minister Mukhtar Altynbayev. The corps is currently based in the city of Shchuchinsk in the Akmola Region.

Organizations

Sarbazy Gazette 
The Central Press Service of the Ministry of Defense operates the Sarbazy (Warrior) Gazette. It was created with the Qysl әsker military newspaper of the Kazakh Military Commissariat. It appeared once a week in the Latin script of the Kazakh language. On 1 November 1969, a newspaper called The Battle Banner began to appear in Alma-Ata. Since each district at that time had its own printed organ, the Central Asian Military District had direct control over the newspaper. In May 1989, the publication was discontinued due to the abolition of the district, and the editorial office was disbanded. Between 1989 and 1992, the Armed Forces explored the idea of recreating a newspaper. The first issue was released on 16 December 1992 in both the Kazakh and Russian languages.

Center for Military Medicine 
The Center for Military Medicine consists of 76 employees, experts, and doctors. The history of the center of military medicine, which has no analogues in Central Asia, began on 1 November 1969, when the forensic laboratory of the Central Asian Military District was established. After Kazakhstan gained independence, it was renamed the Central Medical Laboratory of the Ministry of Defense. In 2010, the institution received its current name. Since 2011, it included an internship of the medical staff of the Armed Forces of Kazakhstan. The medical center provides education in the field of military medicine and is responsible for organizational and educational work in the field of advanced training and course training. The teaching staff is involved in training peacekeepers for United Nations missions. It is attached to the Main Military Medical Directorate of the Ministry of Defence.

Central Army Sports Club 
The Central Army Sports Club (CSKA)  is a Kazakh sports club based in Almaty. The history of military sports in Kazakhstan dates back to 1970, when a sports battalion was formed in the Central Asian Military District, forming in 1974 the 42nd Sports Company and subsequently, the 12th Sports Club of the Army in 1978. On the Directive of the Central Staff of the USSR, on 5 January 1990, the 12th Army Sports club transformed into a Branch of the Order of Lenin Central Sports Club. After independence as achieved, on 11 February 1992, it was reorganized into the Central Army Sports Club of the State Defense Committee. 
In March 1994, it was renamed to the Sports Committee of the Ministry of Defense of the Republic of Kazakhstan. 9 athletes from the club were included in the national team at the 2017 Winter Universiade in Almaty, competing in biathlon, cross-country skiing and ice hockey. In July 2019, club member Sergey Tsyrulnikov, a four-time Guinness record holder, broke a record by using only one hand to nail frying pans and into wooden planks in just under 2 minutes.

Kazspetsexport
Kazspetsexport is a state company funded and controlled by the Ministry of Defence of Kazakhstan. In January 2012, Airbus Military signed a firm contract with Kazspetsexport to supply two EADS CASA C-295 military transport aircraft plus the related service support package for spare parts and ground support equipment.

List of Defence Ministers of Kazakhstan 

 Sagadat Nurmagambetov (May 1992 – 16 October 1995)
 Alybek Kasimov (16 October 1995 – 30 October 1996)
 Mukhtar Altynbayev (30 October 1996 – 9 August 1999)
 vacant from 9 August to 13 October 1999
 Sat Tokpakbayev (13 October 1999 – 8 December 2001)
 Mukhtar Altynbayev (8 December 2001 – 10 January 2007)
 Daniyal Akhmetov (10 January 2007 – 24 June 200
 Adilbek Zhaksybekov (24 June 2009 – 3 April 2014)
 Serik Akhmetov (3 April – 22 October 2014)
 Imangali Tasmagambetov (22 October 2014 – 13 September 2016)
 Saken Zhasuzakov (13 September 2016 – 7 August 2018)
 Nurlan Ermekbaev (7 August 2018 – 31 August 2021)
 Murat Bektanov (31 August 2021 – 19 January 2022)
 Ruslan Jaqsylyqov (since 19 January 2022)

Awards

See also 
Ministry of Defence (Tajikistan)
Ministry of Defense (Kyrgyzstan)
Ministry of Defense (Turkmenistan)
Ministry of Defense (Uzbekistan)

Links 
 Official Website

Sources 

Military of Kazakhstan
Kazakhstan
Defense
1992 establishments in Kazakhstan
Ministries established in 1992